La Dehesa is a suburban neighborhood in Lo Barnechea Commune of Santiago, Chile. It borders Las Condes to the south and Vitacura to the west. It is located in a valley near the Andes, in the northeast of the city, north of the Mapocho River. La Dehesa is known as one of Chile's most affluent neighborhoods.

History

It is believed that the first human group to be discovered here were mainly hunter–gatherer nomads. They came in search of guanacos; they arrived in Santiago in approximately 10,000 BC. Around the year 800 BC, the area became inhabited along the shores of the Mapocho River, representing the first sedentary population, which resulted from the establishment of farming communities and the lamini's domestication. The area was controlled by the Inca and by the Spanish during the seventeenth century. The Spanish were still in control of the area in the early 1800s when Bernardo O'Higgins helped to win its independence from that empire in 1810.

In 1964 there was discovery of important archeological materials in La Dehesa, some of the most important of which were five tembetás, Aconcagua salmón and a fragmented pipe of Mapuche origin. During construction several archaeological deposits were detected with finds linked to the Bato Tradition, evidence that aboriginals previously inhabited the location.

The harshest disaster that occurred in the area was in 1982, when coastal towns were inundated. The area was previously called Huayco, an Inca word that meant: "Place of serious inundations".

Notable people
 Mario Kreutzberger
 Rafael Araneda
 Raquel Argandoña
 Karen Doggenweiler
 Marco Enríquez-Ominami
 Paulina Nin de Cardona
 Augusto Pinochet
 Marcela Vacarezza
 Jorge Valdivia

See also
 Lo Barnechea

References

Geography of Santiago, Chile
Neighborhoods in Santiago, Chile